The Tennessee Wing Civil Air Patrol (CAP) is the highest echelon of Civil Air Patrol in the state of Tennessee. The Wing headquarters are located near Signature Flight Services (FBO) on McGhee Tyson airport in Alcoa, Tennessee. The Tennessee Wing consists of over 1,000 cadet and adult members at over 30 locations across the state.

Mission
The Tennessee Wing performs all three missions of the Civil Air Patrol: providing emergency services; offering cadet programs for youth; and providing aerospace education for both CAP members and the general public.

Emergency services
Always prepared, both in the air and on the ground, members of Civil Air Patrol perform emergency services for state and local agencies as well as the federal government as the civilian auxiliary of the U.S. Air Force and for states/local communities as a nonprofit organization. Ever vigilant, these true patriots make a difference in their communities, not only assisting in times of disaster but also searching for the lost and protecting the homeland. 

In 2022, Tennessee wing provided support to FEMA and other agencies following the spring tornadoes in eastern Kentucky and later, in August, after the severe flooding in western Kentucky.

Cadet programs
Civil Air Patrol’s cadet program transforms youth into dynamic Americans and aerospace leaders through a curriculum that focuses on leadership, aerospace, fitness, and character. As cadets participate in these four elements, they advance through a series of achievements, earning honors and increased responsibilities along the way. Many of the nation’s astronauts, pilots, engineers, and scientists first explored their careers through CAP. It shapes the experiences and aspirations of youth age 12-21, both in and outside CAP’s cadet program. Squadrons with cadets can be found across Tennessee, as shown in the list below.

Aerospace education
Civil Air Patrol’s awarding-winning aerospace education program promotes aerospace, aviation, and STEM-related careers with engaging, standards-based, hands-on curriculum and activities. It provides training to the members of CAP, and also offers workshops for youth and educators across the nation through schools and at public aviation events.
Tennessee CAP holds annual professional development classes for teachers working with grades K-12, and also provides both published materials and STEM kits to homeschool groups.

Organization

Legal protection
Civil Air Patrol members employed within the borders of Tennessee are guaranteed unpaid leave from their place of work without "loss of time, pay not specifically related to leave of absence time, regular leave or vacation, or impairment of efficiency rating" whenever they are activated for duty or training, under TN Code § 8-33-110 (2016).

See also
Awards and decorations of the Civil Air Patrol
Tennessee Air National Guard
Tennessee State Guard

References

External links
Tennessee Wing Civil Air Patrol official website

Wings of the Civil Air Patrol
Education in Tennessee
Military in Tennessee